Jan Svatonský (born 12 May 1984) is a Czech former professional football player who played in the Czech First League for Baník Ostrava and FK Dukla Prague. After a season with MFK Karviná, he joined SFC Opava on a two-year deal in the summer of 2014.

References

External links
 
 Guardian Football

Czech footballers
1984 births
Living people
Czech First League players
FC Baník Ostrava players
FK Dukla Prague players
MFK Karviná players
SFC Opava players

Association football forwards